Clouddead (stylized as cLOUDDEAD) is the debut album by American hip hop trio Clouddead. It was released on May 1, 2001 on Big Dada in the United Kingdom and on May 8, 2001 on Mush Records in the United States. It features guest appearances from Illogic, DJ Signify, Sole, the Wolf Bros., Mr. Dibbs, and the Bay Area Animals.

Critical reception

Stevie Chick of NME wrote, "This music takes the most abstract fallout of trip-hop as its starting point, working in white noise, telephone pranks and post-rock textures to create a disorientating mush you'll spend weeks getting lost in." Thomas Quinlan of Exclaim! stated that "Clouddead follows more along the lines of Frank Zappa or Captain Beefheart than it does hip-hop, but it remains rooted at all times in beats and samples."

Clay Jarvis of Stylus Magazine gave the album a grade of A, commenting that "No combination of adjectives could accurately portray what you'll hear and no second-hand gushing will prepare you for the immense pleasure that is sure to wash over you when you put this album on." Mark Pytlik of AllMusic gave the album 4 stars out of 5, saying, "It's menacing, it's enthralling, and it's one of few modern-day records (hip-hop or otherwise) that honestly doesn't sound like anything -- or anyone -- else."

In 2014, it was described by Arron Merat of Fact as "a key touchstone for the North American hip-hop underground."

Track listing

Personnel
Credits adapted from liner notes.

 Yoni Wolf (Why?) – vocals
 Adam Drucker (Doseone) – vocals
 David Madson (Odd Nosdam) – production
 Illogic – guest appearance (1)
 DJ Signify – guest appearance (4)
 Sole – guest appearance (5)
 The Wolf Bros. – guest appearance (7)
 Mr. Dibbs – guest appearance (9, 10)
 The Bay Area Animals – guest appearance (11, 12)

References

External links
 

2001 debut albums
Clouddead albums
Big Dada albums
Mush Records albums
Albums produced by Odd Nosdam